Naso thynnoides is a tropical fish found in coral reefs in the Pacific and Indian Oceans. It is commonly known as the oneknife unicornfish, oneknife unicorn, thunny unicornfish, singlespine unicornfish, one-spine unicorn, or barred unicornfish. It is of value in commercial fisheries, and is also used in aquaria.

References

External links
 

Naso (fish)
Fish described in 1829
Taxa named by Georges Cuvier